Agenda de Baile (Dancing schedule) is the 18th studio album by Spanish singer-songwriter Camilo Sesto, It was released by RCA Ariola. The album was produced by Sesto and Augusto César and included ten songs written by Sesto. The album was the last one before Sesto's five-year sabbatical.

Track listing
All tracks written by Camilo Blanes.

References

1986 albums
Camilo Sesto albums